Henry Mills Goldsmith (22 July 1885 – 9 May 1915) was a British rower who competed in the 1908 Summer Olympics. He was killed in action during the First World War.

Goldsmith was born at Plympton, Devon and was educated at Jesus College, Cambridge. He rowed for Cambridge  in the Boat Race in 1906 and 1907. Although he did not row in the Boat Race in 1908, he was a member of the Cambridge crew which made up a boat in the eights and won the bronze medal for Great Britain rowing at the 1908 Summer Olympics.

Goldsmith  served in the First World War as a lieutenant with the Devonshire Regiment He was killed in action, aged 29, at Fromelles during the Second Battle of Ypres. His remains were not recovered and his name is inscribed on the Ploegsteert Memorial nearby.

See also
 List of Olympians killed in World War I
 List of Cambridge University Boat Race crews

References

1885 births
1915 deaths
Alumni of Jesus College, Cambridge
English male rowers
Olympic rowers of Great Britain
Rowers at the 1908 Summer Olympics
Olympic bronze medallists for Great Britain
Devonshire Regiment officers
British military personnel killed in World War I
British Army personnel of World War I
Olympic medalists in rowing
Medalists at the 1908 Summer Olympics